KSAM may refer to:

 KSAM (AM), a radio station (1240 AM) licensed to Whitefish, Montana, United States
 KSAM-FM, a radio station (101.7 FM) licensed to Huntsville, Texas, United States